Sidy Sandy (born 31 March 1974) is a Guinean boxer. He competed in the men's light middleweight event at the 2000 Summer Olympics.

References

1974 births
Living people
Guinean male boxers
Olympic boxers of Guinea
Boxers at the 2000 Summer Olympics
Place of birth missing (living people)
Light-middleweight boxers